Parliamentary elections were held in Portugal on 15 April 1894. The result was a victory for the Regeneration Party, which won 101 seats.

Results

The results exclude the six seats won at national level and those from overseas territories.

References

Legislative elections in Portugal
1894 elections in Europe
1894 elections in Portugal
April 1894 events